Cryptandra myriantha is a flowering plant in the family Rhamnaceae and is endemic to southern continental Australia. It is a slender, erect or straggling shrub with cylindrical leaves and more or less sessile clusters of creamy-white to pink flowers.

Description
The upper surface of the leaves is glabrous and the lower surface is covered with minute pimples. Flowering occurs from May to September.

Taxonomy and naming
Cryptandra myriantha was first formally described in 1904 by Ludwig Diels in Botanische Jahrbücher für Systematik, Pflanzengeschichte und Pflanzengeographie from specimens collected near Moora. The specific epithet (myriantha) means "countless-flowered".

Distribution
This cryptandra grows in sandy and gravelly soils in the Avon Wheatbelt, Coolgardie, Esperance Plains, Geraldton Sandplains, Jarrah Forest, Mallee and Swan Coastal Plain bioregions of south-west of Western Australia, and in the south-east of South Australia. In Victoria it is only known from a single collection in the Little Desert region in 1979.

Conservation status
Cryptandra myriantha is listed as "not threatened" by the Western Australian Government Department of Biodiversity, Conservation and Attractions, but as "critically endangered" in Victoria under the Flora and Fauna Guarantee Act 1988.

References

myriantha
Rosales of Australia
Flora of Western Australia
Flora of South Australia
Flora of Victoria (Australia)
Plants described in 1904
Taxa named by Ludwig Diels